Sparrow or Wróbel is a 2010 Polish-British slasher horror film, directed by Shaun Troke, written by Matthew Mosley and Justin Di Febo, and produced by independent filmmaker Wojciech Stuchlik. The film stars Jack W. Carter, Alexis Jayne Defoe, Eric Kolelas, Sarah Linda, Thomas James Longley and Faye Sewell.

Sparrow was shot in Poland on a budget of just £20,000, with a primarily British cast.  The film premiered in October 2010, and was shown at the American Film Market in November 2011.  Sparrow was released on DVD in the U.S in 2013.

Plot

Six teenage friends, set off on a camping trip in the forest. However ‘Camp Happy Dreams’ turns out to be ‘Camp Nightmare’, as legend states it’s the site of a presumed historic murder. The teenagers' disbelief in this urban legend is soon changed when strange happenings begin to occur to each of them.

Cast 
 Faye Sewell as Cindy
 Thomas James Longley as Matt
 Alexis Jayne Defoe as Dawn
 Eric Kolelas as Duncan
 Sarah Linda as Kirsty
 Jack W. Carter as Sitcom
 Jordan Greenhough as Alex
 Nikki Harrup as Tina
 Joseph Stacey as Tim
 Leonora Moore as Pam
 Jennifer Karen as Heather
 Ali Keane as Jeff
 Marian Folga as Sparrow
 Monica Folga as Fiancée
 Peter Saklak as Lover

Production
Originally titled Camp Nightmare, the story was written by underground screenwriters Matthew Mosley and Justin Di Febo.  The story is based around six teenage friends who set off on a camping trip in a forest presumed to be the site of a historic murder.

Casting occurred in the United Kingdom in March 2010.  The role of the serial killer 'Sparrow', was originally to be played by an English actor, but when he was forced to return to England, director Shaun Troke cast Marian Folga, a local artist from Jaworzno, in the role.

Principal filming began in the Hamerla area near Lędziny, Poland in June, supported by a mainly Polish crew, and was completed 23 July, with post-production being completed in late September.

On 22 July 2010, an initial teaser trailer was made public.  Early versions of Sparrow received official screenings on and around Halloween 2010 in Vermont, Poland and South Africa. A British premiere in London is now set for early 2012.

Release

Reception

Critical response to Sparrow was generally positive.  Screen Jabber awarded the film 3 out of a possible 5 stars.

References

External links 
 
 
 

2010 films
2010s slasher films
British horror films
Films shot in Poland
2010 horror films
British independent films
British teen horror films
Polish teen films
Polish horror films
2010s English-language films
2010s British films